A list of windmills in Aude, France

External links
French windmills website

Windmills in France
Aude
Buildings and structures in Aude